RMS Duke of Argyll was an Irish Sea ferry that operated from 1928 to 1956. William Denny and Brothers of Dumbarton on the Firth of Clyde built her for the London Midland and Scottish Railway.  When the LMS was nationalised in 1948 she passed to the British Transport Commission.

History
William Denny and Brothers of Dumbarton built her, completing her in April 1928.

In the Second World War Duke of Argyll became Hospital Ship 65. She assisted the Dunkirk evacuation (Operation Dynamo) in May 1940 and then the evacuation from Cherbourg the following month (Operation Aerial).

Replacement
In 1956 the BTC replaced Duke of Argyll with TSS Duke of Argyll

References

Sources

 Col L.F. Morling, Sussex Sappers: A History of the Sussex Volunteer and Territorial Army Royal Engineer Units from 1890 to 1967, Seaford: 208th Field Co, RE/Christians–W.J. Offord, 1972.

1928 ships
Ships built on the River Clyde
Ferries of the United Kingdom
Passenger ships of the United Kingdom
Ships of British Rail
Ships of the London, Midland and Scottish Railway